Vietnam competed at the 1988 Summer Olympics in Seoul, South Korea.
The delegation included fifteen members (nine athletes, three coaches, and three officials) in five sport disciplines: athletics, swimming, wrestling, shooting, and cycling.

Competitors
The following is the list of number of competitors in the Games.

Athletics

Men's Marathon 
 Nguyễn Văn Thuyết – 3:10.57 (→ 97th place)

Boxing

Men's Light Flyweight (– 48 kg) 
 Đặng Hiếu Hiền 
 First Round — Bye
 Second Round — Defeated Antonio Caballero (ESP), RSC-2
 Third Round — Lost to Michael Carbajal (USA), RSC-1

Cycling

One male cyclist represented Vietnam in 1988.

Men's road race
 Huỳnh Châu

Shooting

Swimming

Men's 100m Breaststroke
 Quách Hoài Nam
 Heat – 1:10.90 (→ did not advance, 54th place)

Men's 200m Breaststroke
 Quách Hoài Nam
 Heat – 2:39.69 (→ did not advance, 50th place)

Women's 100m Butterfly
 Nguyễn Kiều Oanh
 Heat – 1:07.96 (→ did not advance, 34th place)

Women's 200m Butterfly
 Nguyễn Kiều Oanh
 Heat – 2:33.07 (→ did not advance, 27th place)

Wrestling

References

External links
Official Olympic Reports

Nations at the 1988 Summer Olympics
1988
1988 in Vietnamese sport